St. Catherine's Argyle, or St. Cath's, is a Church of Scotland church located in the Grange, Edinburgh. The Scottish churchman and poet Horatius Bonar was its first minister.

In April 2008 the Rev. Victor Laidlaw retired after a 33 year long ministry to the congregation and parish.

The present minister is the Rev. Stuart Irvin.

References

Catherine's, Saint